Polybius is a lunar impact crater in the southeast part of the Moon, and is named after ancient Greek historian Polybius. It is located to the south-southeast of the larger crater Catharina, in the area framed by the Rupes Altai scarp. Some distance to the northeast is the Mare Nectaris, with the flooded craters Beaumont and Fracastorius.

The crater rim of Polybius appears slightly distended in the northeast, and has a cut through the northern wall. But the wall is otherwise moderately intact with only minor erosion. The interior floor is flat and almost featureless, with no central rise. To the south and east, a ray from Tycho cuts across the bowl-shaped Polybius A and Polybius B craterlets.

Satellite craters

By convention these features are identified on lunar maps by placing the letter on the side of the crater midpoint that is closest to Polybius.

Polybius K is sometimes referred to as "Larrieu’s Dam" because the unusually straight northwest rim of the crater creates the appearance of a dam under certain lighting conditions.

References

 
 
 
 
 
 
 
 
 
 
 

Impact craters on the Moon